The Power of the Weak is a 1926 American silent drama film directed by William James Craft and starring  Alice Calhoun, Carl Miller, and Spottiswoode Aitken.

Cast
 Alice Calhoun as Myra 
 Carl Miller as Raymond 
 Spottiswoode Aitken as The Father 
 Arnold Gray as Raymond Bradford
 Marguerite Clayton
 J.C. Fowler

References

Bibliography
 Darby, William. Masters of Lens and Light: A Checklist of Major Cinematographers and Their Feature Films. Scarecrow Press, 1991.

External links

1926 films
1926 drama films
1920s English-language films
American silent feature films
Silent American drama films
Films directed by William James Craft
American black-and-white films
1920s American films